A by-election was held for the New South Wales Legislative Assembly electorate of Croydon on 7 September 1940 because of the resignation of Bertram Stevens, to contest the federal seat of Lang at the 1940 election, however he was unsuccessful.

Dates

Candidates
 Hector Robert (Bob) Hunt was a Sydney solicitor, who with his brother Edward Allan (Ted), established the firm Hunt and Hunt.
 David Hunter was an insurance broker who had been blind since he was six.
 (Frederick) Harold Reed was an Alderman on Burwood Council and a former Mayor.
 George Weir was a barrister and former president of the Australian Public Service Federation.

Result

				

The by-election was caused by the resignation of Bertram Stevens, to contest the federal seat of Lang at the 1940 election.

See also
Electoral results for the district of Croydon (New South Wales)
List of New South Wales state by-elections

References

1940 elections in Australia
New South Wales state by-elections
1940s in New South Wales